Catocala atocala,  Brou's underwing or the atocala underwing,  is a moth of the family Erebidae. It is found from Louisiana west to Oklahoma and north to southern Illinois.

Adults are on wing from July to August. There is probably one generation per year.

The larvae feed on Juglans cinerea and Juglans nigra.

References

External links
Species info

atocala
Moths described in 1985
Moths of North America